Dendropsophus molitor is a species of frog in the family Hylidae, known commonly as the green dotted treefrog.
It is endemic to Colombia.
Its natural habitats are subtropical or tropical high-altitude shrubland, subtropical or tropical high-altitude grassland, shrub-dominated wetlands, swamps, freshwater marshes, intermittent freshwater marshes, pastureland, plantations, rural gardens, urban areas, irrigated land, and seasonally flooded agricultural land.

References

 Guarnizo C.E., Amezquita A., Bermingham E. 2009. The relative roles of vicariance versus elevational gradients in the genetic differentiation of the high Andean frog Dendropsophus labialis. Molecular Phylogenetics and Evolution 50: 84–92.
 

molitor
Amphibians of Colombia
Amphibians of the Andes
Amphibians described in 1863
Endemic fauna of Colombia
Taxonomy articles created by Polbot